is a railway station operated by the Kominato Railway Company's Kominato Line, located in Ichihara, Chiba Prefecture, Japan. It is 20.0 kilometers from the western terminus of the Kominato Line at Goi Station.

History
It was renamed to its present name on January 1, 1958. It has been unattended since 1998.

Lines
Kominato Railway Company
Kominato Line

Station layout
Kazusa-Tsurumai Station has a single side platform serving bidirectional traffic. The overgrown remnants of an unused island platform are still located to one side. The old wooden station building retains a ticket gate, but has been unattended for over a decade.

Platforms

Adjacent stations

External links
  Kominato Railway Company home page

Railway stations in Japan opened in 1925
Railway stations in Chiba Prefecture